Júlio Endi Akamine, S.A.C. (Garça, November 20, 1962) is a Brazilian Catholic archbishop. He is the current metropolitan archbishop of Sorocaba. Akamine is the first Japanese Brazilian named bishop in Brazil.
He was auxiliary bishop of São Paulo and responsible for the Lapa Episcopal Region.

Biography

Born in Garça in 1962, Akamine made his profession of faith to the Pallottine priests on December 8, 1980.
In Curitiba he studied philosophy at the Pontifical Catholic University (1981-1983) and Theology at the Studium Teologicum Claretianum (1984-1987) and was ordained priest on January 24, 1988.

In addition, he obtained the License (1993-1996) and the Doctorate (2002-2005) in Dogmatic Theology at the Pontifical Gregorian University in Rome.

On 4 May 2011 he was appointed by Pope Benedict XVI auxiliary bishop of the Archdiocese of São Paulo and Titular Bishop of Thagamuta. On July 9, 2011, Akamine was ordained bishop by Cardinal Archbishop of São Paulo, Odilo Pedro Scherer and his co-consecrators were Edmar Peron,
Titular Bishop of Mattiana and
Tarcísio Scaramussa, S.D.B.,
Titular Bishop of Segia.

On 28 December 2016 he was appointed by Pope Francis as Archbishop of Sorocaba and took office on February 25, 2017.

References

External links
 http://www.catholic-hierarchy.org/bishop/bakam.html

1962 births
Living people
People from Garça
Brazilian people of Japanese descent
Pallottine bishops
21st-century Roman Catholic archbishops in Brazil
Pontifical Gregorian University alumni
Roman Catholic archbishops of Sorocaba
Roman Catholic bishops of São Paulo
Brazilian expatriates in Italy
Brazilian Roman Catholic archbishops